Marie-Fanny Gournay (6 March 1926 – 4 February 2020) was a French politician.

References

1926 births
2020 deaths
Women mayors of places in France